The Antarctic oscillation (AAO, to distinguish it from the Arctic oscillation or AO), also known as the Southern Annular Mode (SAM), is a low-frequency mode of atmospheric variability of the southern hemisphere that is defined as a belt of strong westerly winds or low pressure surrounding Antarctica which moves north or south as its mode of variability. 

It is a climate driver for Australia, influencing the country's weather conditions – It is associated with storms and cold fronts that move from west to east that bring precipitation to southern Australia.

Phases and impacts

Both positive and negative SAM events tends to last for approximately ten days to two weeks, though the timeframe between a positive and a negative event is random. It is usually in the span of a week to a few months, with a negative SAM being more common in the cool months and a positive SAM being more prolonged in the warmer months. Winds associated with the Southern Annular Mode cause oceanic upwelling of warm circumpolar deep water along the Antarctic continental shelf, which has been linked to ice shelf basal melt, representing a possible wind-driven mechanism that could destabilize large portions of the Antarctic ice sheet.

Positive
In its positive phase, the westerly wind belt that drives the Antarctic Circumpolar Current intensifies and contracts towards Antarctica. In winter, a positive phase increases rainfall (including East coast lows) in south-eastern Australia (above Victoria) due to higher onshore flows from the Pacific Ocean, decreases rain in the south-west, and decreases snow in the alpine areas. In spring and summer, a positive phase reduces the chance of extreme heat and increases humid onshore flows, therefore making spring and summer wetter than normal. A positive phase would usually occur more frequently with a La Niña event.

Negative
Its negative phase involves the belt moving towards the equator, whereby decreasing rainfall in the southeast of Australia in the summer and as well as raising the possibility of spring heatwaves. Moreover, winters will usually be wetter than normal in the south and southwest with more snowfall in the alpine areas, but drier in the east coast due to less moist onshore flows from the east and blockage of cold fronts by the Great Dividing Range, which would act as a rain shadow. This phase will usually be more frequent with an El Niño event.

Research
In 2014, Nerilie Abram used a network of temperature-sensitive ice core and tree growth records to reconstruct a 1000-year history of the Southern Annular Mode. This work suggests that the Southern Annular Mode is currently in its most extreme positive phase over at least the last 1000 years, and that recent positive trends in the SAM are attributed to increasing greenhouse gas levels and later stratospheric ozone depletion.

See also
 Anticyclone
 Arctic oscillation
 North Atlantic oscillation
 Pacific decadal oscillation
 Roaring forties

References

External links 
 http://www.antarctica.ac.uk/met/gjma/sam.html Observation-based SAM index from 1957–present
 http://hurricane.ncdc.noaa.gov/pls/paleox/f?p=519:1:0::::P1_STUDY_ID:16197 1000-year Southern Annular Mode reconstruction
 Monthly Southern Hemisphere Annular Mode (SAM) Index or Antarctic Oscillation (AAO) Index 1850 - 2013
 Daily Southern Hemisphere Annular Mode (SAM) Index or Antarctic Oscillation (AAO) Index 1948 - 2013
 http://www.cpc.ncep.noaa.gov/products/precip/CWlink/daily_ao_index/aao/aao.loading.shtml
 https://web.archive.org/web/20081216220433/http://stratus.astr.ucl.ac.be/textbook//pdf/Chapter_5.pdf (chapter 5.2.3)
SOUTHERN ANNULAR MODE IN AUSTRALIA – What is it?
 The Southern Annular Mode  Introduction to climate dynamics and climate modelling, Université catholique de Louvain

Climate of Antarctica
Regional climate effects
Environment of Antarctica
Climate of Australia
Climate oscillations